Xiaomi Redmi 5 and Xiaomi Redmi 5 Plus (Redmi Note 5 in India) are smartphones developed by Xiaomi Inc, announced on 7 December 2017. They are part of Xiaomi's budget Redmi smartphone line. The Redmi 5 Plus has been rebranded as Redmi Note 5 for the Indian market.

Specifications

Hardware 
Redmi 5 runs on the Snapdragon 450 processor, and the Plus variant runs on Snapdragon 625. Redmi 5 has a 5.7" HD+ display while the Plus comes with 5.99" full HD+ one, both have an 18:9 aspect ratio. The devices look very similar from the front, the main difference being their size. On Redmi 5 Plus, the 5-megapixel front camera is to the right of the earpiece while the flash, with color temperature 4500K, is to the left. On the back, the 12MP camera sensor is right above the fingerprint sensor. The look of the phones at the back is similar to the Redmi Note 4. Both the Redmi 5 and Redmi 5 Plus back camera, unlike the Redmi Note 4's, protrudes slightly from the back.

Redmi 5 Plus has 3GB or 4GB of RAM and 32GB or 64GB of storage, and Redmi 5 has 2GB or 3GB of RAM and 16GB or 32GB  of storage. Storage of both can be expanded by fitting a microSDXC card.

Software 
Redmi 5 Plus and Redmi 5 are both running on MIUI 11, based on Android Oreo 8.1.

Reception 
Redmi 5 Plus received mostly positive reviews. NDTV Gadgets 360 rated the phone at 8/10, describing it as a good all-rounder and value for money. Android Authority rated the phone at 8.5/10 and called it a well-rounded package. The phones have been criticised for lack of NFC support, USB port which is not type C, and the camera bump.

Sales 
Redmi 5 and 5 Plus went on sale in the EU in January 2018 and were priced €170 and €215 respectively.

On 22 February 2018, in the first sale of the phone, the Indian division of Xiaomi claimed to have sold more than 300,000 Redmi Note 5 (Redmi 5 Plus) and Redmi Note 5 Pro units in India in less than three minutes, and called it the biggest sale in the Indian history of smartphones.

References

External links 
 Official website

5
Mobile phones introduced in 2017
Discontinued smartphones
Mobile phones with infrared transmitter